Ed is a television program that aired on NBC from 2000 to 2004. The hour-long comedy-drama starred Tom Cavanagh as the titular character Edward "Ed" Stevens. It also starred Julie Bowen as his love interest Carol Vessey, Josh Randall as his friend Dr. Mike Burton, Jana Marie Hupp as Mike's wife Nancy, Lesley Boone as their friend Molly Hudson, and Justin Long as awkward high-school student Warren Cheswick. The series was created by executive producers Jon Beckerman and Rob Burnett. It was co-produced by David Letterman's Worldwide Pants Incorporated, NBC Productions and Viacom Productions. Ed ran for four seasons, airing a total of 83 episodes.

Series overview

Episodes

Season 1 (2000–2001)

Season 2 (2001–2002)

Season 3 (2002–2003)

Season 4 (2003–2004)

References

External links
 
 

Ed